Museo del duomo di Guardiagrele (Italian for Cathedral Museum of Guardiagrele)  is a  museum of religious art in Guardiagrele, Province of Chieti (Abruzzo).

History

Collection

Notes

External links

Guardiagrele
Museums in Abruzzo
Religious museums in Italy